is a Japanese figure skater. He is a three-season competitor on the Junior Grand Prix circuit and placed 11th at the 2005 Junior Grand Prix, Romania.

Competitive highlights

 WD = Withdrawn

External links
 
https://www.jsfresults.com/

1989 births
Japanese male single skaters
Living people